Syzygium revolutum is a species of plant in the family Myrtaceae. It is endemic to Sri Lanka.

References

Flora of Sri Lanka
revolutum
Taxonomy articles created by Polbot
Taxobox binomials not recognized by IUCN